Budzów  is a village in the administrative district of Gmina Żytno, within Radomsko County, Łódź Voivodeship, in central Poland.

References

Villages in Radomsko County
Piotrków Governorate
Łódź Voivodeship (1919–1939)